A panoramic tripod head is a piece of photographic equipment, mounted to a tripod, which allows photographers to shoot a sequence of images around the entrance pupil of a lens that can be used to produce a panorama. The primary function of the panoramic head is to precisely set the point of rotation about the entrance pupil for a given lens and focal length, eliminating parallax error.

To take a panorama, the camera is rotated at fixed angular increments, taking an image at each point.  These images can then be assembled (stitched) using stitching software, which allows the images to be aligned and combined into a single seamless panoramic image, either automatically (using image analysis) or manually (with user supplied control points).  The final panoramic image can then be viewed or printed as a flat image or viewed interactively using specific playback software.

Professional models include precision bearings, scales to allow the user to take photos at specific angles, detents to stop at common angles and integrated levels to aid in adjusting the tripod.

Robotic panoramic heads are also available.  The robotic head performs the rotation and image capture functions automatically under computer control. Robotic heads can also be used with time-lapse photography.

External links 
 Panoramic Head Comparison list and short description of both commercial and self-made heads from PanoTools.org
 Build your own Panoramic Head — Contains a series of illustrations showing how to make a simple panoramic tripod head.
 How to make a Panoramic Head for Digital SLR cameras — Contains a series of illustrations showing how to make a panoramic tripod head.
 Panosaurus panoramic tripod head — One of the most popular panoramic heads.
 Panohero panoramic tripod head — One of the smallest panoramic heads — for action cameras.
Nodal Samurai A homemade panoramic tripod head bracket for around $2.
Panoramic Tripod Head setup guide Guide on YouTube: How to find the Nodal Point (no parallax point) of your lens...

Panorama photography